Maysoon al-Hashemi (– 27 April 2006) was the head of the Iraqi Islamic Party's women's department until she was shot dead, along with her driver, at the age of 60. This occurred shortly after she met with US Secretary of State Condoleezza Rice and Secretary of Defense Donald Rumsfeld.

She was the sister of former Iraqi Vice-President Tariq al-Hashimi.

References

1940s births
2006 deaths
2006 murders in Iraq
Assassinated Iraqi politicians
Deaths by firearm in Iraq
People murdered in Iraq
21st-century Iraqi women politicians
21st-century Iraqi politicians
Iraqi Islamic Party politicians
Assassinations in Iraq